Givan (also Romanized as Gīvan, Gīvān, and Given) is a village in Gejlarat-e Gharbi Rural District, Aras District, Poldasht County, West Azerbaijan Province, Iran. At the 2006 census, its population was 562, in 101 families.

References 

Populated places in Poldasht County